The Battle of Lewinsville was a small skirmish fought on September 11, 1861, in Lewinsville, Virginia, as part of General McClellan's 1861 operations in Northern Virginia.

Notes

References

 
 

Battles for McClellan's Operations in Northern Virginia of the American Civil War